The men's Greco-Roman 55 kilograms is a competition featured at the 2021 World Wrestling Championships, and was held in Oslo, Norway on 7 and 8 October.

This Greco-Roman wrestling competition consists of a single-elimination tournament, with a repechage used to determine the winner of two bronze medals. The two finalists face off for gold and silver medals. Each wrestler who loses to one of the two finalists moves into the repechage, culminating in a pair of bronze medal matches featuring the semifinal losers each facing the remaining repechage opponent from their half of the bracket.

Each bout consists of a single round within a six-minute limit including two halves of three minutes. The wrestler who scores more points is the winner.

Ken Matsui from Japan won the gold medal after beating Emin Sefershaev from the Russian Wrestling Federation in the final 7–1. Russian wrestlers competed under a modified flag and the name "Russian Wrestling Federation" (RWF) at this competition. Matsui received the first passivity caution in the first round but managed to defend, he scored two points when Sefershaev went down after receiving the passivity caution in the second period. with being 3–1 down Sefershaev took more risks and gave up 4 more points. Nugzari Tsurtsumia of Georgia and former world champion Eldaniz Azizli from Azerbaijan shared the bronze medals.

Results
Legend
F — Won by fall

Main bracket

Repechage

Final standing

References

External links
Official website

Men's Greco-Roman 55 kg